Stephen G. Hicks (February 22, 1809 – December 14, 1869 (or 1866)) was an American soldier [Half Cherokee Indian], born in Jackson County, Georgia. His father, John Hicks, was one of the seven soldiers killed in action at the Battle of New Orleans. Stephen Hicks served in the army during the Black Hawk War, Mexican War and Civil War.

Career
During the American Civil War he enlisted in the 40th Illinois Infantry Regiment on July 22, 1861, and was honorably discharged on the July 24, 1865, at Louisville, Kentucky. In April 1862, he was wounded at the Battle of Shiloh. Because of this injury, he was deemed unfit for active duty and was instead appointed commander at Fort Anderson, Kentucky and took part in the Battle of Paducah in March 1864.

It was there, at Paducah, Kentucky, on March 25, that Confederate General Nathan Bedford Forrest unsuccessfully demanded Hicks' surrender:

Hicks courteously declined.

A bronze bas relief by Bruce Saville of Hicks can be found at Vicksburg National Military Park.

References

Union Army officers
1809 births
1860s deaths
People of Georgia (U.S. state) in the American Civil War
People from Jackson County, Georgia
American military personnel of the Mexican–American War
American people of the Black Hawk War